Bryden Macpherson (born 7 August 1990) is an Australian professional golfer best known for winning The Amateur Championship in 2011.

Amateur career
Macpherson was born in Melbourne, Australia. He won the Dunes Medal in 2008, an amateur event in Australia, and set two course records in the process, shooting a 64 and then bettering it with a 63. He enrolled at the University of Georgia in 2009 and was named Southeastern Conference Freshman of the Year and was also named to the second All-SEC team. He also won the Australian Amateur Stroke Play and the New Zealand Amateur Stroke Play in 2009. In 2010, he represented his country for the Eisenhower Trophy, the premier world amateur team golf championship. Macpherson won The Amateur Championship in 2011. This victory earned him a spot in the 2011 Open Championship and the 2012 Masters Tournament. He missed the cut at the Open by a stroke.

Professional career
Macpherson turned professional following the 2012 Masters Tournament. By doing so, he forfeited his invitation to the 2012 U.S. Open.

He qualified for the 2014 Open Championship after a T-4 finish at the 2013 Australian Open. (The Australian Open was an International Qualifying Tournament for The Open.) He missed the cut after rounds of 90 and 80, leaving him 26-over-par. His round of 90 was the highest score in the opening round for 15 years.

Macpherson had status on three different professional tours for 2014 (PGA Tour China, PGA Tour of Australasia, OneAsia Tour). He was the first active PGA Tour China member to play in a major. Macpherson qualified for the Web.com Tour for the 2015 season. After failing to retain his Web.com Tour privileges, he returned to PGA Tour China where he won twice and finished the season leading the Order of Merit, earning him a return to the Web.com Tour for 2016. Macpherson had a disappointing 2016 season, lost his Web.com Tour card and played on the China Tour in 2017, winning the Fragrant Hills Beijing Open and finishing second in the Order of Merit.

Amateur wins
2008 Dunes Medal
2009 Australian Amateur Stroke Play, New Zealand Amateur Stroke Play
2011 The Amateur Championship
2012 Georgia Cup

Professional wins (5)

PGA Tour of Australasia wins (2)

China Tour wins (3)

Playoff record
Asian Tour playoff record (0–1)

Results in major championships

CUT = missed the half-way cut
"T" = tied

Team appearances
Amateur
Nomura Cup (representing Australia): 2009
Eisenhower Trophy (representing Australia): 2010
Australian Men's Interstate Teams Matches (representing Victoria): 2008 (winners), 2009 (winners)

References

External links
 

Macpherson's Facebook page

Australian male golfers
Georgia Bulldogs men's golfers
Golfers from Melbourne
1990 births
Living people